David Lilly (born 14 January 1986 in Coatbridge) is a Scottish footballer who is currently the head coach at East Tennessee State Buccaneers.

Career

College and amateur
Lilly attended Milligan College which played in the NAIA Appalachian Athletic Conference (AAC).  He was the AAC Player of the Year in 2005.  In 2006, he was both the Conference and Regional Player of the Year.  He was also a 2005 and 2006 NAIA honorable mention All American.

Lilly began his professional career in 2006 with West Virginia Chaos of the USL Premier Development League, before going on to play for Mississippi Brilla in 2007. On 16 April 2008, the Carolina RailHawks of the USL First Division announced they had signed Lilly for the 2008 season. On 9 April 2009, he returned to the Brilla.

Coaching
In 2007, in addition to playing with Mississippi Brilla, Lilly also served as an assistant coach with both the men's and women's soccer teams at Milligan College.

David Lilly was a graduate assistant coach for East Tennessee State University men's soccer team.

In January 2018, Lilly rejoined his alma mater Milligan University as head coach of the men's soccer team.

In December 2021,Lilly rejoined ETSU Mens Soccer team as Head Coach.

References

External links
 Carolina RailHawks Player Profile

1984 births
Living people
American soccer coaches
North Carolina FC players
Mississippi Brilla players
Scottish expatriate footballers
Scottish footballers
Footballers from Coatbridge
USL First Division players
West Virginia Chaos players
USL League Two players
Association football midfielders
Scottish expatriate sportspeople in the United States
Expatriate soccer players in the United States
Scottish expatriate football managers
Expatriate soccer managers in the United States
Milligan Buffaloes men's soccer coaches
East Tennessee State Buccaneers men's soccer coaches